King Xiao of Zhou, personal name Ji Bifang, was the eighth king of the Chinese Zhou Dynasty. Estimated dates of his reign are 891–886 BC or 872–866 BC. 
He was a son of King Mu and brother of King Gong.

His reign is poorly documented. He was preceded on the throne by his nephew King Yì of Zhou and followed by his nephew's son, King Yí of Zhou. Sima Qian says that the second Yi was 'restored by the many lords'. This hints at a usurpation, but the matter is not clear.

Noble Feizi was granted a small fief at Qin by King Xiao. King Xiao learned of his reputation and put him in charge of breeding and training horses for the Zhou army. To reward his contributions, King Xiao wanted to make Feizi his father's legal heir instead of his half-brother Cheng.

Family
Queens:
 Wang Jing

Ancestry

See also
Family tree of ancient Chinese emperors

Sources 

886 BC deaths
Zhou dynasty kings
9th-century BC Chinese monarchs
Year of birth unknown